Roquetaillade-et-Conilhac is a commune in the Aude department in southern France. The municipality was established on 1 January 2019 by merger of the former communes of Roquetaillade and Conilhac-de-la-Montagne.

See also
Communes of the Aude department

References

Communes of Aude

Communes nouvelles of Aude
Populated places established in 2019
2019 establishments in France